The Bali Peace Park Project is a memorial project founded in 2003, on the first anniversary of the first Bali bombing.

History

An unauthorized proposed commercial development by Balinese businessman Kadek Wirinatha was halted by the Balinese Government officials, and a meeting was called between the Australian Consulate and the Governor. Following this, the Governor and Regent of Badung both reaffirmed their support for the development of the Peace Park and stated that no other building permits, including that of a planned nightclub would be granted.
 
In December 2009, the Association was granted Deductible Gift Recipient status (DGR - allowing tax deductible donations) by the Australian Federal Government. 

In March 2010, the Project formed part of Australian Prime Minister Kevin Rudd's Foreign Affairs brief for his meeting with Indonesian President Susilo Bambang Yudhoyono in Canberra.  At the time Association representatives also met with Governor Made Mangku Pastika who was traveling with Indonesian President Susilo Bambang Yudhoyono to provide an updated report on the Project's progress. In 2019, Australian Prime Minister Scott Morrison committed to funding the purchase of the Sari Club site subject to a commercial deal being struck between the Bali Peace Park Association and the landowners. The land owners declined the offer made by the Association in favour of a deal offered by Dallas Finn.  As a result, the Association ceased its interest in the land and Finn has been unable to fund the purchase at the price he offered.

References

External links

Bali Peace Park

Peace parks
Australia–Indonesia relations
2003 establishments in Australia